Costică Toma (1 January 1928 – 13 May 2008) was a Romanian international football goalkeeper and later manager.

Playing career
He was born in Brăila, into a family coming from Muralto, Switzerland. Toma began his football career in 1940, when he played for FC Suter as a striker. After a period when he played as a youth for Capșa București, he moved to Iași. He played only a season at CS ta, and after two months at Câmpulung Moldovenesc, he moved to Steaua București. He played twelve years for the Army club, and was a part of the Steaua Golden Team. He had at Steaua a famous and a fair-play rivalry with Ion Voinescu. It was said that Toma and Voinescu were the best couple of goalkeepers that a Romanian football club ever had. Toma won also 16 caps for Romania.

Toma retired from professional football in 1961.

Coaching career
Despite being a great goalkeeper, Toma was not a successful manager. He managed only lower league sides and also a large number of youth teams.

Honours
Steaua București
Divizia A: 1952, 1953, 1956, 1959–60, 1960–61
Cupa României: 1952, 1955

Personal life
Toma was married and had two children living today in Geneva, Switzerland. He died in Bucharest in 2008, and was buried in the city's Ghencea Military Cemetery.

References

External links

1928 births
2008 deaths
Sportspeople from Brăila
Romanian footballers
Romania international footballers
Liga I players
Liga II players
FC Steaua București players
Association football goalkeepers
Burials at Ghencea Cemetery